Jens Werrmann (born 29 May 1985 in Bad Kreuznach) is a German hurdler.

He finished 6th in the 110m hurdles final at the 2006 European Athletics Championships in Gothenburg.

Competition record

External links

1985 births
Living people
German male hurdlers
People from Bad Kreuznach
Sportspeople from Rhineland-Palatinate